The prune plum (Prunus domestica subsp. domestica) is a fruit-bearing tree, or its fruit. It is a subspecies of the plum Prunus domestica. The freestone fruit is similar to, but distinct from, the clingstone damson (Prunus domestica subsp. insititia) and is especially popular in Central Europe.

Regional names and etymology 
The fruit is known under various regional names, including "blue plum", "damask plum", "sugar plum", and "German prune" in English-speaking countries, and "Zwetschge" in German-speaking ones. The word Zwetschge, plural Zwetschgen, is from the German. Variants of the word include: Quetsch(e) (Lorraine, Alsace, Luxembourg, and regionally in Germany); Kwetsen (Dutch), Zwetschke (regionally in Austria); and Zwetsche (regionally in Germany). These names, like damson, are thought ultimately to derive from postulated Vulgar Latin *davascena, altered from damascena, meaning "of Damascus", reflexes of which appear mainly in Franco-Provençal, e.g. daveigne (Jura), dav(d)gna (Franche-Comté).

Description
The prune plum tree is often found in streuobstwiesen. It grows to 6–10 m in height; older trees have spreading branches. The bark is brownish. The leaf is simple, 4–10 cm long, alternate, petiolate, crenulate, and elliptic. The blossom appears in April and May in the Northern Hemisphere, before or with foliation, and is white, greenish-white, or yellowish-green on two or three downy pedicels. The fruit is a freestone drupe. It is less round than other plums, its ends are more pointed and the groove is less pronounced.

Uses
The red-brown wood is used in fine cabinetry.

The fruit, which ripens in August and September in the Northern Hemisphere, is a popular seasonal table fruit. It is also used for making prunes.

Prune plums hold their form well at oven temperatures and are much used in baking, for example in tarts such as quetschentaart and zwetschgenkuchen. They are the sole ingredient in the traditional powidl jam of Austria and the Czech Republic, and the main ingredient in schmootsch, a similar but spiced jam from Silesia. Fermented zwetschgen are distilled to make eaux de vie: zwetschgenwasser or zwetsch (in Austria, Germany, and Switzerland), zwetschgeler (in South Tyrol, Italy), and quetsch (in Alsace, France). Carlsbad plums are a candied zwetschgen confection named after Carlsbad (now Karlovy Vary) in the Czech Republic. Szilvásgombóc and zwetschkenknödel are potato dumplings with a zwetschgen filling in Hungary and Austria respectively, served as a sweet main course or as a dessert. At Christmas markets in Germany, for example the Christkindlesmarkt in Nuremberg, a zwetschgenmännla ("little zwetschge man") or zwetschgenweibla ("little zwetschge woman"), with a walnut head, a body of dried figs, and limbs of dried zwetschgen, is a popular treat.

Varieties
Examples of varieties are 'Seneca', 'Stanley', 'Fellenberg', Prunier d'Ente (also known as d'Agen), and Prunier Perdrigone.

More than a hundred varieties of prune plums are grown in Central Europe. Examples include Cacaks Beste, Elena, Hauszwetschge, and Ortenauer.

References 
Notes

Sources
Some information in this article is from the corresponding article on German Wikipedia

Plum cultigens